The 1914–15 North Carolina Tar Heels men's basketball team (variously "North Carolina", "Carolina" or "Tar Heels") was the fifth varsity college basketball team to represent the University of North Carolina.

Roster and schedule

|+ Schedule
|-
!colspan=6 style="background:#4B9CD3; color:#FFFFFF;"| Regular season

References

Footnotes

Citations

Bibliography

North Carolina
North Carolina Tar Heels men's basketball seasons
North Carolina Tar Heels Men's Basketball
North Carolina Tar Heels Men's Basketball